Ribalta is a surname. Notable people with the surname include:

Francesc Ribalta (1565–1628), Spanish painter
Imara Esteves Ribalta (born 1978), Cuban beach volleyball player 
José Ribalta (born 1963), Cuban boxer
Josleidy Ribalta (born 1990), Cuban track and field athlete 
Juan Ribalta (1597–1628), Spanish painter